William Henry Falconer (born 5 April 1966 in Aberdeen) is a Scottish former professional footballer, who played for a string of Scottish and English clubs from 1982 to 2003. He could play in virtually any position on the pitch, but was most commonly used as a striker.

Career
Falconer began his career playing for his home town club, Aberdeen, in 1982, and had an initial loan spell at Junior team Lewis United. During his six years at Pittodrie Stadium, he made 77 league appearances and scored 13 goals. Never more than a squad member other than in his final season, he did play enough games to earn a 1984–85 Scottish Premier Division winner's medal, and also played and scored in the 1987 Scottish League Cup Final (lost on penalties).

Falconer then moved south of the border to Watford for £300,000 in 1988. During his three years at Vicarage Road, he played 71 games, scoring 12 goals. He also gained a reputation as a no-nonsense, tough tackling midfielder, and was sent off the field on more than one occasion.

In 1991, Falconer transferred to Middlesbrough (then managed by Lennie Lawrence) in a swap deal involving Trevor Putney moving the other way. His first season at Boro was successful, with the team winning promotion from the old 2nd Division and entering the inaugural Premier League, and also reaching the semi finals of the League Cup. However, the next season wasn't as happy as an ill-equipped Middlesbrough side were relegated from the Premier League. The following summer Falconer was sold to Sheffield United for £400,000.

After less than a season at Bramall Lane, in early 1994 Falconer was transferred back north of the border to Celtic for £350,000. Although only at the club for two years, and behind others such as Pierre van Hooijdonk and Andreas Thom for a place in the side, he became something of a cult hero in Glasgow. He came on as a substitute in the club's 1995 Scottish Cup Final win. His transfer also spelt the end for the Celtic board at that time, as the bank refused to pay his transfer fee. A transfer to Motherwell in January 1996 was followed by a free transfer in summer 1998 to Dundee to strengthen their newly-promoted team, along with several other Motherwell players including Tommy Coyne.

After three successful years in the Scottish Premier League with Dundee, in which he played alongside Claudio Caniggia and was both top scorer and named their supporters' player of the year in 2000, Falconer's career involved four clubs in two years, playing for Clydebank, St Johnstone and Clyde in Scotland and Grimsby in England.

Falconer returned to Motherwell to become a coach of the under-19 side for several years, and later operated a property rental business in Scotland.

References

External links

 
 Profile and stats at AFC Heritage Trust
 Player profile at The Celtic Wiki
 Club profile at Sporting-Heroes.net

1966 births
Aberdeen F.C. players
Lewis United F.C. players
Celtic F.C. players
Clyde F.C. players
Clydebank F.C. (1965) players
Dundee F.C. players
Grimsby Town F.C. players
Living people
Middlesbrough F.C. players
Motherwell F.C. players
Motherwell F.C. non-playing staff
Footballers from Aberdeen
Scottish Junior Football Association players
Premier League players
Scottish Football League players
Scottish footballers
Scottish Premier League players
Sheffield United F.C. players
St Johnstone F.C. players
English Football League players
Watford F.C. players
Association football forwards
Association football utility players